AnastasiaDate is an international online dating website that primarily connects men from North America with women from Eastern Europe.

History 
AnastasiaDate was founded in 1993.

In the early 1990s when the company first launched, it used catalogs to introduce men to Russian women. The company launched its first website in January 1997 and expanded its business in more cities throughout Russia and Ukraine. By 2003, it experienced global growth beyond northern Asia.

Following the growth of AnastasiaDate, the company spun off three websites during 2007, each connecting western men with women from different areas of the world: AmoLatina, AsianBeauties (now AsianDate), and AfricaBeauties.

AnastasiaDate was featured in the Canadian documentary film Love Translated in 2010.

Fortune reported that the company earned $110 million in 2012. The website's traffic also grew by 220% in 2012.

In 2013, the company hired Mark Brooks, whom Anne VanderMey described in Fortune as "a prominent online dating industry consultant", as its Chief Strategy Officer. In the Fortune interview, Brooks said that his goal was to improve the reputation of AnastasiaDate and the international online dating industry as a whole, saying that the industry is "on the cusp of respectability".

In 2013, AnastasiaDate launched its first mobile app on iTunes and Google Play for Apple Inc. and Android devices. The company alleged in a US Federal Court in New York complaint that EM Online had created two websites, anastasiadatefraud.com and ruadventures.com, to broadcast fabricated, negative testimonials, but the complaint was dismissed.

AnastasiaDate ltd appears in the ICIJ offshore leaks database and is linked to both Malta and the British Virgin Islands. The dating.com group parent company also appears in the ICIJ offshore leaks database.

Ownership 
In 2011, AnastasiaDate was sold by Anastasia International to a private investor. The company and its sister sites are now owned by Social Discovery Ventures, now part of the Dating Group. A separate company, SOL Networks, based in Malta, is a stakeholder of AnastasiaDate. In October 2019, SOL Holdings and SDVentures merged to create the Dating Group. AnastasiaDate has previously been "registered" in Cyprus, Latvia, Seychelles and Malta. Dmitry Borisovich Volkov recently commented about the known fraud committed by Elizabeth Holmes, that "the sentence of Elizabeth Holmes is a threat to visionaries" and "Entrepreneurs make you believe that the possible future is as real as the present".

Operations 
AnastasiaDate is one of the largest international dating services. Users can register for an account  on the internet or through its mobile app. The site features various communication services such as email correspondence, live chat and video chat. Women access the site through a Ukrainian portal, svadba.com.

The site is mostly used by wealthy American men between the ages of 35 and 60. The site makes money by charging users who want to meet Eastern European women. As of 2012, such users buy credits "priced on a sliding scale, starting at $15.99 for 20 credits, and going up to $399.99 for 1,000. Each minute of simple, instant messaging-style chatting costs one credit. Special, premium smilies – like a vibrating, multi-color LOL – cost extra. Cam share (audio not enabled) costs six credits a minute. Video chat with voice costs even more". The Fortune article observes: "And thanks to people like me willing to pay to talk with beautiful young women like Anastasia – who was paid to respond – the trade is doing pretty well".

Users that register on AnastasiaDate may also be co-registered on their affiliated partner websites: AfricanDate/AfricaBeauties, ArabianDate, AsianBeauties/AsianDate, AmoLatina, ChinaLove, YourChristianDate, EuroDate, FlirtWith, DateMyAge, YourTravelMates, Dil Mil, uDates and Dating.com. Many are based on similar software architecture platforms.

Reputation 
The legitimacy of AnastasiaDate has previously come into question. The Guardian journalist reported that "none of the men I became close to on my tour ended up in lasting relationships, and the majority appeared to fall victim to a number of sophisticated scams". A girl on the site who was interviewed  "explained the whole sordid array of techniques, from a light impersonalised online-chatting version to a full-service chauffeur-driven platinum fraud, where men are rinsed of cash for a full week in Odessa, thinking they are cementing a lifelong relationship while actually they are being strung along on platonic dates that end with them dispatched to the airport with heavy hearts and empty wallets". The same article added that "AnastasiaDate insists that it weeds out scams whenever it finds them, and has banned some women from the site".

Even acting within the regulations, international dating sites like AnastasiaDate could potentially exploit women in less-developed countries and male suitors in developed countries. A 2014 report in The Guardian found examples of exploitation for both genders.

AnastasiaDate was mentioned in Dan Slater's novel, "Love in the Time of Algorithms: What Technology Does to Meeting and Mating." In this book, Slater followed a small group of men on an unsuccessful attempt to meet women in person who they had met online via Anastasia's AmoLatina website (the women all coincidentally disappeared when the men arrived in Colombia to meet them).  He concludes as well that "the staffs of local bridal agencies will often pose as the women in the profiles, responding to incoming messages in order to keep the rubles rolling in". Anastasia was also featured in a movie Love Translated.

DDOS attack 
In September 2015, Anastasiadate.com suffered from a series of DDoS attacks that rendered it inaccessible to users for four to six hours every day. Having demonstrated their capability, hackers contacted the dating site and demanded US$10,000 (£7,234) in exchange for stopping further attacks.

After this incident, Anastasiadate.com hired a data security company to investigate this case, identify those responsible, and bring the perpetrators to justice. During the investigation experts at International data security firm Group-IB confirmed that the attack was carried out by Ukrainian nationals Gayk Grishkian and Inna Yatsenko. They also found that the two hackers targeted other prominent firms like US-based Stafford Associated that leased data center and hosting facilities and another firm named PayOnline.

Subsequently, a complaint filed by the company helped Ukrainian authorities arrest the two hackers and an analysis of data stored in their confiscated devices confirmed their involvement in the crimes. After they pleaded guilty, they were sentenced to five years in prison.

Reception 

With the growth of online services like AnastasiaDate, the International Marriage Broker Regulation Act was passed in 2005 to regulate the industry. News outlets call AnastasiaDate the leading "premium international dating" website and have observed its efforts to seemingly rebrand the mail-order bride industry, within which it is grouped.

References

External links 
 

Internet properties established in 1993
Online dating services